Ronague ( or ) is a tiny hamlet in the south of the Isle of Man, in the parish of Arbory. It consists of an old chapel, several houses and some farms. It lies to the north of the villages of Ballabeg and Colby, west of the hamlet of Grenaby and south of the hill South Barrule.

On the A27 road between Ronague and the Round Table is the seemingly magical magnetic hill. A gravity hill, it appears to pull cars uphill when their drive is not engaged (grid reference ).

References 

Populated places in the Isle of Man